Teuta is an Albanian feminine given name, derived from an Illyrian word or title meaning "Queen".: 

People bearing the name include:

Teuta, Illyrian Queen
Teuta Arifi (born 1969), Macedonian politician of Albanian origin
Teuta Cuni (born 1973), retired Swedish boxer
 (born 1982), Kosovo Albanian actress
 (born 1986), Kosovo Albanian singer
Teuta Matoshi, Kosovo Albanian fashion designer
 (born 1976), Kosovo Albanian singer
Teuta Topi (born 1961), former First Lady of Albania

Other 
KFF Teuta, an Albanian women's football club
KF Teuta B, an Albanian football club
KF Teuta Durrës, an Albanian football team
BC Teuta Durrës, an Albanian basketball team
Teuta Vissarion, the eponymous character of Bram Stoker's 1909 novel The Lady of the Shroud

References

External links 
 https://www.behindthename.com/name/teuta

Given names
Albanian feminine given names